The 2015–16 Green Bay Phoenix women's basketball team represented the University of Wisconsin-Green Bay in the 2015–16 NCAA Division I women's basketball season. The Phoenix, led by head coach Kevin Borseth, in his 13th year overall at Green Bay and the fourth of his current stint at the school, played their home games at the Kress Events Center and were members of the Horizon League. It was the 37th season of Green Bay women's basketball. They finished the season 28–5, 16–2 in Horizon play to win the Horizon League regular and tournament titles to earn an automatic to the NCAA women's tournament. They lost to Tennessee in the first round.

Roster

Schedule

|-
!colspan=9 style="background:#006633; color:#FFFFFF;"| Exhibition

|-
!colspan=9 style="background:#006633; color:#FFFFFF;"| Non-conference regular season

|-
!colspan=9 style="background:#006633; color:#FFFFFF;"| Horizon League regular season

|-
!colspan=9 style="background:#006633; color:#FFFFFF;"| Horizon League Women's tournament

|-
!colspan=9 style="background:#006633; color:#FFFFFF;"| NCAA Women's tournament

Rankings

See also
2015–16 Green Bay Phoenix men's basketball team

References

Green Bay Phoenix
Green Bay Phoenix women's basketball seasons
Green